Saia v. New York, 334 U.S. 558 (1948), was a case in which the Supreme Court of the United States held that an ordinance which prohibited the use of sound amplification devices except with permission of the Chief of Police was unconstitutional on its face because it established a prior restraint on the right of free speech in violation of the First Amendment.

Facts of the case 
Saia, a minister of the Jehovah's Witnesses, obtained from the Lockport Chief of Police permission to use sound equipment mounted on his car to amplify lectures on religious subjects. The lectures were given at a fixed place in a public park on designated Sundays. When this permit expired, he applied for another one but was refused on the ground that complaints had been made. Saia nevertheless used his equipment as planned on four occasions, but without a permit. Fines and jail sentences were imposed, which were affirmed without opinion by the County Court for Niagara County and by the New York Court of Appeals.

Prior history 
Saia was tried in Police Court for violations of the ordinance. It was undisputed that he used his equipment to amplify speeches in the park and that they were on religious subjects. Some witnesses testified that they were annoyed by the sound, though not by the content of the addresses; others were not disturbed by either. The court upheld the ordinance against the contention that it violated appellant's rights of freedom of speech, assembly, and worship under the Federal Constitution. Fines and jail sentences were imposed. His convictions were affirmed without opinion by the County Court for Niagara County and by the New York Court of Appeals, 297 N.Y. 659, 76 N.E.2d 323.

Decision of the Court
Justice Douglas delivered the opinion of the Court, writing:

We hold that 3 of this ordinance is unconstitutional on its face, for it establishes a previous restraint on the [334 U.S. 558, 560]    right of free speech in violation of the First Amendment which is protected by the Fourteenth Amendment against State action. To use a loud- speaker or amplifier one has to get a permit from the Chief of Police. There are no standards prescribed for the exercise of his discretion. The statute is not narrowly drawn to regulate the hours or places of use of loud-speakers, or the volume of sound (the decibels) to which they must be adjusted. The ordinance therefore has all the vices of the ones which we struck down in Cantwell v. Connecticut, 310 U.S. 296, 128 A.L.R. 1352; Lovell v. Griffin, 303 U.S. 444; and Hague v. C.I.O., 307 U.S. 496.

See also
 List of United States Supreme Court cases, volume 334

Sources

References

United States Supreme Court cases
United States Free Speech Clause case law
Jehovah's Witnesses litigation in the United States
1948 in United States case law
Niagara County, New York
United States Supreme Court cases of the Vinson Court
1948 in religion
Christianity and law in the 20th century